Li Yajun (born 8 October 1973 in Guiyang, Guizhou) is a male Chinese sports shooter, who competed for Team China at the 2008 Summer Olympics.

Major performances
1995 National Intercity Games – 1st double trap
2000 Asian Championships – 1st double trap
2001/2002/2004/2006/2007 National Shooting Series – 1st double trap

Records
2007 National Shooting Series Leg 2 – 144, double trap (NR)

References
 

1973 births
Living people
People from Guiyang
Chinese male sport shooters
Olympic shooters of China
Shooters at the 2008 Summer Olympics
Trap and double trap shooters
Sport shooters from Guizhou
Shooters at the 2006 Asian Games
Shooters at the 2010 Asian Games
Asian Games competitors for China